Karatmanovo is a village in the municipality of Lozovo, North Macedonia.

Demographics
According to the 2002 census, the village had a total of 520 inhabitants. Ethnic groups in the village include:

Macedonians 515
Turks 5

References

Villages in Lozovo Municipality